China National Highway 302 (G302) runs from Hunchun in Jilin to Ulanhot in Inner Mongolia.

Route and distance

See also
 China National Highways

Transport in Inner Mongolia
Transport in Jilin
302